Gaudenzia Inc (New Image Women and Children) is a drug or alcohol rehabilitation center with a primary focus on mental health and substance abuse treatment based at 1300 East Tulpehocken Street in Philadelphia, Pennsylvania.  The provider may also be called or have a program named New Image Women & Children.

References

External links

Drug and alcohol rehabilitation centers
Organizations based in Philadelphia
1968 establishments in Pennsylvania
Organizations established in 1968
Addiction organizations in the United States
Mental health organizations in Pennsylvania